Emery G. Barrette (June 30, 1930 – April 4, 1993) was an American United Methodist Church minister and politician.

Barrette was born in Saint Paul, Minnesota and graduated from Johnson High School in Saint Paul. He graduated from Hamline University in 1954 and from Drew University in 1954. Barrette also went to Luther Seminary. He served as a minister for the United Methodist Church in Minnesota. Barrette served on the Saint Paul School Board from 1970 to 1980 and was a Republican. Barrette served in the Minnesota House of Representatives in 1967 and 1968 and in the Minnesota Senate in 1979 and 1980. He died from cancer at his home in Stillwater, Minnesota.

Notes

1930 births
1993 deaths
Clergy from Saint Paul, Minnesota
Politicians from Saint Paul, Minnesota
People from Stillwater, Minnesota
American United Methodist clergy
Hamline University alumni
Drew University alumni
Luther Seminary alumni
School board members in Minnesota
Republican Party members of the Minnesota House of Representatives
Republican Party Minnesota state senators
Deaths from cancer in Minnesota
20th-century American clergy